Jeffrey James Grant (born 1958)
is a former New Zealand politician of the National Party.

He attended Otago Boys' High School, and Lincoln College where he got a Diploma in Agriculture.

He represented the Southland electorate of Awarua in Parliament from 1987 to 1993, when he retired, and was replaced by Eric Roy. In 1990 he was appointed the National Party's Chief Whip.

He later worked in a large number of governance roles, including for Landcorp, the New Zealand Meat Board, AgResearch, SBS Bank and the Southern Institute of Technology.

In 2020 he was appointed as an independent advisor to support the Invercargill City Council, following a Department of Internal Affairs review into Tim Shadbolt, the Mayor of Invercargill.

References

1958 births
Living people
New Zealand National Party MPs
Members of the New Zealand House of Representatives
People educated at Otago Boys' High School
Lincoln University (New Zealand) alumni
New Zealand MPs for South Island electorates